Yana Ranra (Quechua yana black, ranra stony; stony ground, "black stony ground", also spelled Yanarangra) is a mountain in the Andes of Peru, about  high. It is situated in the Huancavelica Region, Castrovirreyna Province, on the border of the districts of Castrovirreyna and Santa Ana. Chuqi Warmi lies south of the lake Urququcha, southwest of Yuraq Pata and Chuqi Warmi, and southeast of Runa Wañusqa Urqu.

References 

Mountains of Peru
Mountains of Huancavelica Region